Cancilla is a genus of sea snails, marine gastropod mollusks in the family Mitridae.

Species
Species within the genus Cancilla include:
 Cancilla baeri (Turner & Cernohorsky, 2003)
 Cancilla chihsiungi S.-I Huang & Q.-Y. Chuo, 2019
 Cancilla fallowense Marrow, 2020
 Cancilla fibula Poppe, Tagaro & Salisbury, 2009 
 Cancilla heinickei (Salisbury & Guillot de Suduiraut, 2003) 
 Cancilla herrmanni Dekkers, 2014 
 Cancilla isabella Swainson, 1831
 Cancilla rehderi (J.H. Webb, 1958)
 Cancilla rikae (Guillot de Suduiraut, 2004)
 Cancilla schepmani (Salisbury & Guillot de Suduiraut, 2003)
 Cancilla suni S.-I Huang & Q.-Y. Chuo, 2019
 Cancilla turneri Poppe, Tagaro & Salisbury, 2009
Taxa inquirenda
 Cancilla beyerlei Jousseaume, 1894 
 Cancilla innesi Jousseaume, 1894 
 Cancilla sura Jousseaume, 1898 
Species brought into synonymy
 Subgenus Cancilla (Domiporta) Cernohorsky, 1970: synonym of Domiporta Cernohorsky, 1970
 Cancilla abyssicola: synonym of Profundimitra abyssicola (Schepman, 1911)
 Cancilla aegra: synonym of Nebularia aegra (Reeve, 1845)
 Cancilla antoniae Adams, H.G., 1870 : synonym of Neocancilla pretiosa (Reeve, 1844) 
 Cancilla apprimapex: synonym of Gemmulimitra apprimapex Poppe, Tagaro & Salisbury, 2009
 Cancilla armonica: synonym of Imbricaria armonica (T. Cossignani & V. Cossignani, 2005)
 Cancilla carnicolor (Reeve, 1844): synonym of Domiporta carnicolor (Reeve, 1844)
 Cancilla citharoidea (Dohrn, 1862): synonym of Domiporta citharoidea (Dohrn, 1862)
 Cancilla cloveri Cernohorsky, 1971 : synonym of Swainsonia cloveri (Cernohorsky, 1971) 
 Cancilla duplilirata: synonym of Gemmulimitra duplilirata (Reeve, 1845)
 Cancilla filaris (Linnaeus, 1771): synonym of Domiporta filaris (Linnaeus, 1771)
 Cancilla gloriola (Cernohorsky, 1970): synonym of Domiporta gloriola (Cernohorsky, 1970)
 Cancilla granatina (Lamarck, 1811): synonym of Domiporta granatina (Lamarck, 1811)
 Cancilla larranagai (Carcelles, 1947): synonym of Subcancilla larranagai (Carcelles, 1947)
 Cancilla liliformis Huang & Salisbury, 2017: synonym of Cancillopsis liliformis (S.-I Huang & R. Salisbury, 2017) (original combination)
 Cancilla meyeriana: synonym of Calcimitra meyeriana (Salisbury, 1992)
 Cancilla planofilum: synonym of Profundimitra planofilum Huang, 2011
 Cancilla praestantissima (Röding, 1758): synonym of Subcancilla praestantissima (Röding, 1798)
 Cancilla rufilirata (Adams & Reeve, 1850): synonym of Domiporta rufilirata (Adams & Reeve, 1850)
 Cancilla scrobiculata: synonym of Subcancilla scrobiculata (Brocchi, 1814) †
 Cancilla shikamai (Habe, 1980): synonym of Domiporta shikamai Habe, 1980
 Cancilla sigillata (Azuma, 1965): synonym of Domiporta sigillata (Azuma, 1965)
 Cancilla strangei (Angas, 1867): synonym of Roseomitra strangei (Angas, 1867)
 Cancilla turtoni (Smith, 1890): synonym of Ziba gambiana (Dohrn, 1861)

References

 Sheppard, A (1984). The molluscan fauna of Chagos (Indian Ocean) and an analysis of its broad distribution patterns. Coral Reefs 3: 43-50
 Drivas, J. & M. Jay (1988). Coquillages de La Réunion et de l'île Maurice 
 Vaught, K.C. (1989). A classification of the living Mollusca. American Malacologists: Melbourne, FL (USA). . XII, 195 pp.
 Rolán E., 2005. Malacological Fauna From The Cape Verde Archipelago. Part 1, Polyplacophora and Gastropoda

External links
 Swainson W. (1840) A treatise on malacology or shells and shell-fish. London, Longman. viii + 419 pp.

 
Gastropod genera